Stohl or Štohl is a surname. Notable people with this surname include:
András Stohl (born 1967), Hungarian actor
Bob Stohl, American new age and electronic musician in duo Emerald Web
Hank Stohl, American actor in American made-for-television horror film Satan's Triangle (1975) and Capricorn One (1977)
Hollylynne Stohl, American mathematics and statistics educator
Igor Štohl (born 1964), Slovak chess player
Ján Štohl (1932–1993), Slovak astronomer, namesake of asteroid 3715 Štohl
Manfred Stohl (born 1972), Austrian rally driver
Margaret Stohl (born 1967), American novelist
Michael Stohl (born 1947), American professor of communications

See also
Stanley Stohl, fictional character in American television drama Chicago Med